Fort Boreman is a historic archaeological site encompassing a Civil War fortification located near Parkersburg, Wood County, West Virginia. It was built in 1863, by Company A of the 11th West Virginia Volunteer Infantry Regiment.  It is a series of paired, approximately four foot deep trenches encircling the top of the hill in a zigzag pattern.  It was originally built to ensure that the Baltimore and Ohio Railroad link between Wheeling and Parkersburg was not severed or commandeered by the Confederate army. The fort was named after Arthur I. Boreman, West Virginia's first Governor.

It was listed on the National Register of Historic Places in 2002.

References

Buildings and structures in Parkersburg, West Virginia
Archaeological sites on the National Register of Historic Places in West Virginia
Boreman
Wood County, West Virginia, in the American Civil War
American Civil War sites in West Virginia
Mountains of West Virginia
Military installations established in 1863
1863 establishments in West Virginia
National Register of Historic Places in Wood County, West Virginia
American Civil War on the National Register of Historic Places